The St. Louis County Council is the seven member legislative body of St. Louis County, Missouri.

Composition
Each of the councilmen come from a different one of the counties seven council districts.  The council chooses its own chair and vice-chair.  
The councilmen representing even numbered districts are elected in United States presidential years, while councilmen representing odd numbered districts are elected in even numbered years without presidential elections.

Leadership

Current members

Committees

References

External links 
 County Council website

Government of St. Louis County, Missouri
Local government in Missouri